Never Cry Another Tear is the only studio album by Bad Lieutenant. It was released on 12 October 2009. Ex-New Order member Bernard Sumner formed the group with Jake Evans and Phil Cunningham. The three guitarists wrote and performed the album together with a number of additional musicians. During recording sessions Blur bassist Alex James and ex-New Order drummer Stephen Morris worked with the band on some of the tracks.

Release
Never Cry Another Tear was released in several formats, namely: A Standard 12 track CD, Limited Edition Digipak CD with two bonus tracks, an iTunes Digital download with 3 bonus tracks and a Double-LP Vinyl. These versions were followed one week later on 19 October by Box set versions, namely: A Deluxe Boxset consisting of the CD with bonus tracks an LP without the bonus tracks plus a 7" vinyl single, 12" booklet and an artwork print. A further Super Deluxe Boxset was released which featured all of the deluxe contents with a T-shirt.

The album reached #70 in its first week on the UK Albums Chart. Sales were accounted from digital downloads and the regular CD version.

Never Cry Another Tear was promoted by two singles. "Sink or Swim" backed with "Dynamo" was the lead single, and was released on 28 September 2009. "Twist of Fate" was selected as the second single, it was backed with a remix of "Poisonous Intent", and was released on 22 March 2010. Neither single charted in the UK.

Critical response

Never Cry Another Tear received a generally mixed response from critics. At Metacritic, which assigns a normalised score out of 100 to reviews from mainstream critics, the album received a score of 59, based on 11 reviews, indicating "mixed or average reviews". Many reviews focused on the departure of Peter Hook, John Bush writing for Allmusic guide writes: "Never Cry Another Tear accentuates the melodic guitar pop and straightforward lyricism of New Order's work in the 2000s. Although Hook is missed, the low end sounds quite good indeed in the capable hands of Chapman and [Alex] James". Though few reviews were negative outright, many were lukewarm about the group's less-electronic direction. Tom Ewing of Pitchfork Media described the album as "A specifically British strain of guitar rock, in fact, with the rhythm section sidelined and the guitars themselves often blending into a mid-range soup with keyboards and backing vocals".

Track listing
All songs written and composed by Phil Cunningham, Jake Evans, Bernard Sumner except where noted.

Personnel
Bad Lieutenant
 Bernard Sumner – vocals, guitars, keyboards, bass, scaleta 
 Jake Evans – vocals, guitars, keyboards, bass, harmonica 
 Phil Cunningham – guitars, keyboards, bass

Guest musicians
 Matt Evans – backing vocals (1, 2, 4, 6, 7, 10, 11, 12, 13), drums (2, 6)
 Jack Mitchell – drums (1, 3, 4, 9, 10)
 Tom Chapman – bass (5)
 Stephen Morris – drums (5, 11), programming (7)
 Alex James – bass (9, 10, 13, 14)
 Carl Jackson – drums (13, 14)

Versions
 Standard CD (12 tracks)
 Limited Edition Digipak (14 tracks)
 Deluxe Boxset (CD & LP, plus exclusive 7" vinyl single, 12" Bad Lieutenant booklet and artwork print)
 Super Deluxe Boxset (CD & LP, plus same contents as above along with an exclusive T-shirt)
 Digital Download – iTunes (15 tracks)

References

2009 debut albums
Bad Lieutenant (band) albums